Pavel Olegovich Solomatin (born 4 April 1993) is a Russian football player.

Club career
He made his debut in the Russian Second Division for FC Karelia Petrozavodsk on 18 April 2011 in a game against FC Petrotrest St. Petersburg.

He played his first match in Russian Premier League for FC Dynamo Moscow on 16 March 2013 as a substitute in away game against FC Kuban Krasnodar (1-1).

References

1993 births
Sportspeople from Tolyatti
Living people
Russia youth international footballers
Russia under-21 international footballers
Russian footballers
Association football forwards
Association football midfielders
FC Dynamo Moscow players
Russian Premier League players
FC Anzhi Makhachkala players
FC Amkar Perm players
FC Baltika Kaliningrad players
FC Volgar Astrakhan players
FC Torpedo Moscow players
FC Akron Tolyatti players